A road church  is a roadside church, one of a network of such churches in Denmark, Germany (open all year), Estonia, Finland, Norway, Russia (Murmansk oblast) and  Sweden. The churches are kept open for tourists during the summer holiday season.

Czech Republic

The only road church in the Czech Republic is the Chapel of Reconciliation, located at D5 motorway in west Bohemia near Pilsen, built in 2008.

Denmark
List of road churches in Denmark

Estonia
List of road churches in Estonia

Finland
List of road churches in Finland

The first road churches were opened in Finland during the 1990s. There are about 265 churches that act as roadside churches in the summer time. Most of the churches are Lutheran and some are Finnish Orthodox.

Germany

The first road church was opened in Germany in 1958. In 2012 there are 39 road churches or chapels.	Some of them were built on purpose in a rest area, others are old village churches which happen to be situated near an access point. In liturgical terms, they range from ecumenical chapels with no formal rank up to fully consecrated Roman Catholic churches. Churches are open all year.

 Ökumenische Autobahnkapelle Dammer Berge
 Ökumenische Autobahnkapelle Roxel
 Evangelische Autobahn- und Gemeindekirche Exter
 Evangelisch-lutherische Autobahn- und Gemeindekirche Peter und Paul, Uhyst am Taucher
 Ökumenische Autobahnkapelle Geismühle
 Katholische Autobahnkapelle St. Raphael, Nievenheim
 Evangelische Autobahn- und Gemeindekirche Gelmeroda
 Evangelische Autobahn- und Gemeindekirche Waldlaubersheim (Martinskirche)
 Katholische Autobahnkirche St. Christophorus Himmelkron, Bad Berneck
 Autobahnkirche "Maria, Schutz der Reisenden", Adelsried
 Katholische Autobahnkirche St. Christophorus, Baden-Baden
 Katholische Autobahn- und Pfarrkirche "Maria am Wege", Windach
 Evangelische Autobahn- und Gemeindekirche Duben
 Katholische Autobahnkapelle St. Antonius, Gescher/Coesfeld
 Ökumenische Autobahnkapelle "Galluskapelle", Leutkirch im Allgäu
 Evangelische Autobahnkirche Medenbach
 Evangelische Autobahn- und Gemeindekirche Kavelstorf
 Ökumenische Autobahnkapelle "Jesus - Brot des Lebens", Groß-Hesepe
 Ökumenische Autobahnkapelle "Emmauskapelle", Engen (near Singen)
 Ökumenische Autobahnkirche "Licht auf unserem Weg", Geiselwind
 Evangelische Autobahn- und Gemeindekirche Werbellin
 SVG-Autohofkapelle Schlüchtern
 Autobahnkirche Siegerland
 Evangelische Autobahn- und Gemeindekirche St. Benedikt, Hohenwarsleben
 Evangelische Autobahn-, Stadt- und Klosterkirche Brehna
 Evangelische Autobahn- und Gemeindekirche St. Petri, Brumby
 SVG-Autohofkapelle Hessisch Lichtenau
 SVG-Autohofkapelle Schwabhausen
 Ökumenische Autobahnkirche Waidhaus
 SVG-Autohofkapelle Kirchheim/Hessen
 Ökumenische Autobahnkirche Jakobikirche, Wilsdruff
 Evangelische Autobahn- und Gemeindekirche St. Pancratius, Rothenschirmbach, OT der Lutherstadt Eisleben
 Autohofkapelle an der A 44 Kassel-Dortmund, Abfahrt Diemelstadt
 Evangelische Autobahnkirche St. Kilian
 Autobahnkapelle Kassel "Licht auf dem Weg"
 Autobahnkapelle Hamm
 Autobahnkirche RUHR in Bochum
 Autobahnkirche St. Paul, Wittlich
 Autobahnkirche St. Thomas von Aquin, Trockau
 Evangelische Nikolaikirche und katholische St. Marienkirche Grasdorf (Holle)

Italy 

San Giovanni Battista, Highway A11, called "Church of the Motorway" (1960–64), by Giovanni Michelucci

Norway
List of road churches in Norway

Russia
List of road churches in Russia
There were two road churches in Murmansk oblast open in summer 2012.

Sweden

List of road churches in Sweden

References

 
Churches in the Czech Republic
Churches in Denmark
Churches in Estonia
Churches in Norway
Churches in Russia
Churches in Sweden
1958 introductions